Faed Arsène (born 21 June 1985) is a Malagasy international footballer who last played in Belgium for Royal Mouscron-Péruwelz, as a striker.

Career
Arsène has played club football in France and Belgium for CS Avion, Lens B, CS Louhans-Cuiseaux, USL Dunkerque, Olympic de Charleroi-Marchienne and Royal Mouscron-Péruwelz.

He made his international debut for Madagascar in 2010.

Personal life
His father is Hervé Arsène.

References

External links

1985 births
Living people
Malagasy footballers
Madagascar international footballers
RC Lens players
CS Avion players
Louhans-Cuiseaux FC players
R. Olympic Charleroi Châtelet Farciennes players
Expatriate footballers in Belgium
Expatriate footballers in France
Malagasy expatriates in France
Association football forwards